Protomelas dejunctus, the fire blue hap, is a species of cichlid endemic to Lake Malawi where it is only known from around Chinyankwazi Island and Chinyamwezi Island in the southern portion of the lake. This species can reach a length of  SL. Some authorities have revised this taxon's status to that of a subspecies of Protomelas taeniolatus.

References

dejunctus
Fish of Lake Malawi
Fish of Malawi
Fish described in 1993
Taxobox binomials not recognized by IUCN
Taxonomy articles created by Polbot